Harmony Township is one of the ten townships of Clark County, Ohio, United States. The 2010 census reported 3,577 people living in the township, 3,193 of whom lived in the unincorporated portions of the township.

Geography
Located in the eastern part of the county, it borders the following townships:
Pleasant Township - north
Somerford Township, Madison County - northeast
Union Township, Madison County - east
Paint Township, Madison County - southeast
Madison Township - south
Green Township - southwest corner
Springfield Township - west
Moorefield Township - northwest

The village of South Vienna is located in the northern part of the township, and the unincorporated community of Plattsburgh lies at the center of the township.

Name and history
Harmony Township was founded in 1818.

Statewide, the only other Harmony Township is located in Morrow County.

Government
The township is governed by a three-member board of trustees, who are elected in November of odd-numbered years to a four-year term beginning on the following January 1. Two are elected in the year after the presidential election and one is elected in the year before it. There is also an elected township fiscal officer, who serves a four-year term beginning on April 1 of the year after the election, which is held in November of the year before the presidential election. Vacancies in the fiscal officership or on the board of trustees are filled by the remaining trustees.

References

External links
County website

Townships in Clark County, Ohio
1818 establishments in Ohio
Populated places established in 1818
Townships in Ohio